Spangle may refer to:
Spangle (or sequin), a small, thin, often circular piece of glittering metal or other material, used especially for decorating garments
Spangle, the aesthetic feature of visible crystallites on the surface of galvanized steel
Spangle, Washington, United States
 Spangle (novel), a 1987 historical novel by Gary Jennings
 Spangle (Papilio protenor), a swallowtail butterfly of India
 Yellow-crested spangle (Papilio elephenor), a swallowtail butterfly of India
 Spangle Lake
 Gold spangle, a moth of the family Noctuidae
 Radial Spangle, an indie rock band from Norman, Oklahoma, United States

See also 
 Spangles (disambiguation)
 Spang (disambiguation)